Cecilie Enger (born 21 February 1963) is a Norwegian journalist, novelist and children's writer.

She was born in Oslo. Her literary breakthrough was the novel Brødrene Henriksen from 2000. She was awarded the Norwegian Booksellers' Prize in 2013 for her autobiographical novel Mors Gaver.

Enger works as journalist for the newspaper Dagens Næringsliv.

References

1963 births
Living people
Writers from Oslo
Norwegian women novelists
Norwegian children's writers
20th-century Norwegian novelists
21st-century Norwegian novelists
21st-century Norwegian women writers
20th-century Norwegian women writers